Aziziye is a municipality and governed district in Greater Erzurum, Turkey. Erzurum is one of 30 metropolitan centers in Turkey having more than one municipality within its city borders. Erzurum has three second-level municipalities within the city in addition to the municipality of Greater Erzurum (büyükşehir). The population of the district center was 41,069 as of 2013. Erzurum  was declared a metropolitan center in 1993. The municipality of Aziziye was established in 1993 by merging Ilıca and Dadaşkent. The corresponding district governorate was established in 2008. The district center is famous for thermal springs (39.40C)

Neighbourhoods 

 Ağcakent
 Ahırcık
 Akdağ
 Akyazı
 Alaca
 Alaybeyi
 Aşağıcanören
 Atlıkonak
 Aynalıkale
 Başçakmak
 Başkent
 Başkurtdere
 Başovacık
 Bingöze
 Çamlıca
 Çatak
 Çavdarlı
 Çavuşoğlu
 Çıkrıklı
 Çiğdemli
 Dağdagül
 Eğerti
 Elmalı
 Emrecik
 Eskipolat
 Eşkinkaya
 Gelinkaya
 Geyik
 Güllüce
 Halilkaya
 Kabaktepe
 Kapılı
 Karakale
 Kavaklıdere
 Kızılkale
 Kumluyazı
 Kuzgun
 Kuzuluk
 Ocak
 Paşayurdu
 Rizekent
 Sarıyazla
 Sırlı
 Sorkunlu
 Söğütlü
 Taşpınar
 Tebrizcik
 Toprakkale
 Üçköşe
 Yeşilova
 Yeşilvadi
 Yoncalık
 Yukarıcanören

References and notes 

Populated places in Erzurum Province
Districts of Erzurum Province
Hot springs of Turkey